Aswani Rajbanshi was an Indian cricketer. He played for Assam. Rajbanshi was born at Pandu in Guwahati. He played 19 first-class matches for Assam from 1954/55 to 1964/65 and took 88 wickets. He died on February 28, 2002.

References

External links
 

Indian cricketers
Assam cricketers
Cricketers from Guwahati
Cricketers from Assam
2002 deaths
Year of birth missing